Alfred Alexander Burt VC (3 March 1895 – 9 June 1962) was an English recipient of the Victoria Cross, the highest and most prestigious award for gallantry in the face of the enemy that can be awarded to British and Commonwealth forces.

Details 
Burt was employed as a gas fitter for the Broxbourne Gas Company and had enlisted as a territorial soldier in the Hertfordshire Regiment in 1911. On the outbreak of the First World War he was mobilised and arrived on the Western Front in November 1914 with 1/1st battalion of the Hertfordshires. On the date of the action for which he was awarded the Victoria Cross, he was aged 20 years, and serving as a corporal. The 27 September 1915 was the third day of the British offensive known as the Battle of Loos and his battalion was preparing to assault the German lines beside Cuinchy.

The citation for the medal reads:

He received his medal from the King in March 1916 and returned to the front to serve for the remainder of the war, being promoted to the rank of Sergeant. On 11 November 1920 he was among the 100 strong honour guard of Victoria Cross holders in the interment of the Unknown Warrior at Westminster Abbey.

He died at the age of 67 in Chesham in 1962, his health having suffered from complications caused by his exposure to a gas attack during the war. There is a road named in his honour in Chesham; Alfred Burt VC close.

The medal 
His Victoria Cross is held at the Hertford Museum as part of the Hertfordshire Regiment collection.

References 

Monuments to Courage (David Harvey, 1999)
The Register of the Victoria Cross (This England, 1997)
VCs of the First World War – The Western Front 1915 (Peter F. Batchelor & Christopher Matson, 1999)

External links 
 Location of grave and VC medal (Hertfordshire)
 Bedfordshire Regiment
 Herts Memories

1895 births
1962 deaths
People from Hertford
Hertfordshire Regiment soldiers
British World War I recipients of the Victoria Cross
British Army personnel of World War I
British Army recipients of the Victoria Cross
Military personnel from Hertfordshire